East Lempster is an unincorporated community in the town of Lempster in Sullivan County, New Hampshire, United States.

The village is located at the intersection of New Hampshire Route 10 with the Second New Hampshire Turnpike, a country road leading northwest to Lempster village, the town of Unity, and the city of Claremont. Route 10 connects East Lempster with Newport to the north and Marlow and Keene to the south.  Mountain Road, a continuation of Second New Hampshire Turnpike, leads southeast over Lempster Mountain to the town of Washington.

References

Unincorporated communities in New Hampshire
Unincorporated communities in Sullivan County, New Hampshire
Lempster, New Hampshire